Dhan is a village in the Tehsil of Jawali, Himachal Pradesh in India. As of the 2011 census, the village had a population of 1,878 persons in 399 households. The chief elected official is a Sarpanch.

Attractions

The Vaishno Devi Mandir is located in Dhan Village, approximately 2 kilometres from Jawali in samlana-mutlahr-jawali Road. The temple is established on 30 November 2012.

Education 
Schools in Dhan include:
Saraswati Public School Dhan
Little Flower Public School Dhan

References

External links
Dhan at villageinfo.in

Villages in Kangra district